Amefrontia is a genus of moths of the family Noctuidae. The genus was erected by George Hampson in 1899.

Species
Amefrontia monochroma Hacker, 2016 Yemen
Amefrontia purpurea Hampson, 1899 Socotra, Kenya, Zimbabwe
Amefrontia zillii Hacker, Hoppe, Lehmann & Stadie, 2011 Oman, Yemen

References

External links

Acronictinae
Noctuoidea genera